The National Intelligence Service (NIS; Korean: 국가정보원, 국정원) is the chief intelligence agency of South Korea. The agency was officially established in 1961 as the Korean Central Intelligence Agency (KCIA; Korean: 중앙정보부), during the rule of President Park Chung-hee's military Supreme Council for National Reconstruction, which displaced the Second Republic of Korea. The original duties of the KCIA were to supervise and coordinate both international and domestic intelligence activities and criminal investigation by all government intelligence agencies, including that of the military. The agency's broad powers allowed it to actively intervene in politics.  Agents undergo years of training and checks before they are officially inducted and receive their first assignments.

The agency took on the name Agency for National Security Planning (ANSP; Korean: 국가안전기획부, 안기부) in 1981, as part of a series of reforms instituted by the Fifth Republic of Korea under President Chun Doo-hwan. Besides trying to acquire intelligence on North Korea and suppress South Korean activists, the ANSP, like its predecessor, was heavily involved in activities outside its sphere, including domestic politics and promoting the 1988 Summer Olympics. During its existence, the ANSP engaged in numerous human rights abuses such as torture, as well as election tampering.

In 1999, the agency assumed its current name. The advent of democracy in the Sixth Republic of Korea has seen many of the duties and powers of the NIS curtailed in response to public criticisms about past abuses.

History

Korean Central Intelligence Agency
The agency's origins can be traced back to the Korean Counterintelligence Corps (KCIC), formed during the Korean War. The KCIA was founded on 13 June 1961 by Kim Jong-pil, who drew much of the organization's initial 3,000-strong membership from the KCIC. Kim, a Korean Military Academy graduate and nephew of Park Chung-hee by marriage, is also credited with masterminding the 1961 coup d'etat that installed Park before he was elected president of Korea.

The intelligence service was extensively used by President Park's government to suppress and disrupt anti-government or pro–North Korean or other pro-communist movements, including the widespread student protests on university campuses and the activities of overseas Koreans. The KCIA developed a reputation for interfering in domestic politics and international affairs beyond its jurisdiction. The KCIA's original charter, the Act Concerning Protection of Military Secrets, was designed to oversee the coordination of activities related to counterespionage and national security, but a majority of its activities and budget were devoted to things unrelated to its original charter.

The KCIA controlled the whole country, with more than forty thousand regular employees and one million correspondents. Striking workers, protesters or signatories of simple petitions faced long prison sentences and torture, with the whole company under constant surveillance.

In 1968, KCIA agents kidnapped 17 Koreans living in West Germany. They were transported back to Seoul, where they were tortured and brought up on charges of having violated the National Security Law by engaging in pro-Northern activities. The victims became a cause célèbre as the kidnapping created a firestorm of international criticism that almost brought the West German government to break off diplomatic relations with South Korea. It further served as a harbinger when the much-publicised kidnapping of a dissident, Kim Dae-jung — who would later become the president of Korea and the country's first Nobel Peace Prize recipient, in 2000 — took place in 1973 off the coast of a Japanese resort town.

The KCIA's virtually unlimited and completely unchecked power to arrest and detain any person on any charge created a climate of extreme fear and repression. The frequent detention and torture of students, dissidents, opposition figures, communists, reporters, or anyone perceived to be critical of the government was symptomatic of the Park presidency and the subsequent administration. In another departure from its original charter, the KCIA's assumptive role as political machine extraordinaire and domination of the country's political life began to take on even more bizarre forms such as exercising a free hand in drafting the South Korean constitution and acting as a political fundraiser for the incumbent party.

In addition to its presumptive intelligence and secret police role, which was ostensibly authorized by its original charter, it also became, by default, through a network of agents at home and abroad, the de facto attorney general and inspector general of the South Korean government. Domestically, the KCIA made itself the philanthropical arm of the government by being an avid supporter of the arts, promoter of tourism, and purveyor of national culture.

The KCIA is known to have raised funds through extortion and stock market manipulation, which were in turn used to bribe and cajole companies, individuals and even foreign governments, as happened during the Koreagate scandal in the United States in 1976. Investigations by United States Congressman Donald M. Fraser found the KCIA to have funneled bribes and favors through Korean businessman Tongsun Park in an attempt to gain favor and influence in Washington, D.C.; some 115 Members of Congress were implicated in the affair.

Agency for National Security Planning
In 1979, the agency's director, Kim Jae-kyu, assassinated President Park Chung Hee during a dinner. In the aftermath, the KCIA was purged, with Jae-Kyu and five others being executed, and temporarily lost much of its power.

The new director, Chun Doo-hwan, used his tenure from April to July 1980 to expand his power base beyond the military, and the organization was renamed the Agency for National Security Planning in 1981, with its powers redefined in presidential orders and legislation.

The ANSP, like its predecessor, was a cabinet-level agency directly accountable to the president, and the director of the ANSP continued to have direct presidential access.

In March 1981, the ANSP was redesignated as the principal agency for collecting and processing all intelligence. The requirement for all other agencies with intelligence-gathering and analysis functions in their charters to coordinate their activities with the ANSP was reaffirmed.

Legislation passed at the end of 1981 further redefined the ANSP's legally mandated functions to include the collection, compilation, and distribution of foreign and domestic information regarding public safety against communists and plots to overthrow the government.

The maintenance of public safety with regard to documents, materials, facilities, and districts designated as secrets of the state was the purview of the ANSP, as was the investigation of crimes of insurrection and foreign aggression, crimes of rebellion, aiding and abetting the enemy, disclosure of military secrets, and crimes provided for in the Act Concerning Protection of Military Secrets and the National Security Act. The investigation of crimes related to duties of intelligence personnel, the supervision of information collection, and the compilation and distribution of information on other agencies' activities designed to maintain public safety also were undertaken by the ANSP.

By 1983 the ANSP had rebounded and again was the preeminent foreign and domestic intelligence organization.

Nevertheless, the ANSP's domestic powers were indeed curtailed under the Sixth Republic. Prior to the change, the ANSP had free access to all government offices and files. The ANSP, Defense Security Support Command, Office of the Prosecutor General, Korean National Police, and the Ministry of Justice had stationed their agents in the National Assembly of Korea to collect information on the activities of politicians.

In May 1988, however, overt ANSP agents, along with agents of other intelligence agencies, were withdrawn from the National Assembly building.

The ANSP's budget was not made public, nor apparently was it made available in any useful manner to the National Assembly in closed sessions. In July 1989, pressured by opposition parties and public opinion, the ANSP was subjected to inspection and audit by the National Assembly for the first time in eighteen years, with the ANSP removed its agents from the chambers of the Seoul Criminal Court and the Supreme Court.

In another move to limit the potential for the ANSP to engage in "intelligence politics," the ANSP Information Coordination Committee was disbanded because of its history of unduly influencing other investigating authorities, such as the Office of the Prosecutor General. Additionally, the ANSP, responding to widespread criticism of its alleged human rights violations, set up a "watchdog" office to supervise its domestic investigations and to prevent agents from abusing their powers while interrogating suspects.

The ANSP remained deeply involved in domestic politics, however, and was not fully prepared to relinquish its power. In April 1990, for example, ruling Democratic Liberal Party (DLP) coleader Kim Young-sam complained that he and members of his faction within the DLP had been subjected to "intelligence maneuvering in politics" that included wiretapping, surveillance, and financial investigations.

Despite an agreement in September 1989 by the chief policymakers of the ruling and opposition parties to strip the ANSP of its power to investigate pro–North Korean activity (a crime under the National Security Act), the ANSP continued enforcing this aspect of the law rather than limiting itself to countering internal and external attempts to overthrow the government. The ANSP continued to pick up radical student and dissident leaders for questioning without explanation.

Aside from its controversial internal security mission, the ANSP also was known for its foreign intelligence gathering and analysis and for its investigation of offenses involving external subversion and military secrets. The National Unification Board and the ANSP (and the KCIA before it) were the primary sources of government analysis and policy direction for South Korea's reunification strategy and contacts with North Korea. The intelligence service's pursuit of counterespionage cases was also held in high regard.

Contemporary history

In 1994, the ANSP had a significant revision of its charter, which effectively limited its activities, following an agreement between Korea's ruling and opposition parties. As a result, an "Information Committee" in the National Assembly was established to lay a foundation for the agency's removal from the political scene and an assumption of political neutrality. The ANSP also began to develop procedures and mechanisms to thwart international crime and terrorism. In 1995, the ANSP moved to a new headquarters site in Naegok-dong, southern Seoul, from its previous location on Namsan mountain, in Imun-dong, where it had been located for the past 34 years.

Most specifics regarding the agency's organizational makeup remain classified by the Seoul government. A 1998 investigation by the Sisa Journal into the structure of the agency (then the ANSP) estimated that it employed some 60,000 employees across 39 headquarters and regionally-based departments, spending an estimated 700–800 billion South Korean won per year.

In the presidential election held in December 2012, NIS committed a serious crime secretly helping Park Geun-hye's campaign, according to Korean police investigation report. Korean prosecutors are re-investigating this incident which could void the result of last year's presidential election. Former NIS chief Won Sei-hoon is awaiting trial on multiple charges including presidential election fraud.

In 2015, Hacking Team's breached data showed that NIS purchased spyware from Hacking Team. An agent related to the hack was found dead in an apparent suicide. In his note, he said that the agency didn't spy on civilians or on political reactions related to 2012's presidential election.

National Intelligence Service
In 1999, it was officially renamed the National Intelligence Service.

According to its official publications, the NIS is divided into three directorates: International affairs, Domestic affairs, and North Korean affairs. Its current officially stated mission assigns the NIS responsibility for the:
 Collection, coordination, and distribution of information on the nation's strategy and security.
 Maintenance of documents, materials, and facilities related to the nation's classified information.
 Investigation of crimes affecting national security, such as the Military Secrecy Protection Law, the National Security Law.
 Investigation of crimes related to the missions of NIS staff.
 Planning and coordination of information and classified.

The election of Roh Moo-hyun to the South Korean presidency in 2003 brought more concerted efforts to reform the agency. Roh appointed Ko Young-koo, a former human rights lawyer, to the position of director, expressing a desire to find "someone who will set the agency straight". The anti-communist bureau of the agency was slated to be eliminated, and many domestic intelligence and surveillance activities were either abandoned or transferred to national police forces.

In December 2008, it was alleged by the official media-arm of North Korea, the Korean Central News Agency, that a NIS-trained North Korean citizen had been apprehended as part of a plot to assassinate Kim Jong-il, the North Korean leader. Both the NIS and the South Korean government denied any involvement.

The NIS officially admitted in 2011 that it wiretapped Gmail accounts of South Korean citizens in the South Korean Constitutional Court.

The 2012 budget for the NIS could potentially get cut as it had shown its inefficiencies.

In 2016, a prosecutors' investigation had turned up evidence that the NIS has been effectively orchestrating the activities of conservative groups since the administration of former president Lee Myung-bak (2008–2013). The evidence shows that the NIS has been involved not only in political advertisements that conservative groups have run in newspapers but also in their plans to hold one-person protests and to hand out pamphlets: "An agent surnamed Park who was on the NIS's psychological warfare team supported and supervised right-wing conservative organizations and right-wing youth organizations."

On December 13, 2020, the National Security Law was amended. This law, adopted in 1948, was designed to protect the country from North Korean threats. It stated that South Korean citizens could not praise, sympathise, correspond or aid North Koreans. However, this law has been said to have allowed the NIS to violate some important human rights, such as the forcing of confessions, as well as conducting "anti-communist" investigations. This law allowed authorities to imprison someone for up to seven years for simply possessing a book relating to North Korean ideologies. The law also extended to punishing "anti-governmental organizations", allowing the NIS to punish civilians who spoke out against or had differing ideals to the government, breaching their right to the freedom of speech. Due to the continuous threat from North Korea, there are concerns that amending this law would further exacerbate this issue.

Despite this amendment, there are still major concerns that the NIS will continue to breach human rights. Even though the amendment forbids the NIS from conducting criminal investigations, it still allows the collection of information on anyone violating the National Security Law. This new amendment will prohibit the involvement of the NIS in domestic politics following their attempt to influence the 2012 elections with a slanderous campaign against candidate Moon Jae-in. Effective from 1 January 2024, the amendment will now transfer the power to investigate domestic concerns to the national police service.

In June 2018, three former NIS directors (Lee Byung-kee, Lee Byung-ho, and Nam Jae-joon) who served in the Park administration were found guilty of bribery, related to the 2016 Park Geun-hye scandals. They illegally transferred money from the NIS budget to Park's presidential office without any approval or oversight from the National Assembly. This illegally obtained money was used by Park and her associates for private use and to pay bribes.

On December 14, 2020, the National Assembly passed a bill that transferred investigation authority of the NIS into North Korean activities in South Korea to the Korean National Police Agency.

Related South Korean legislative bodies

Scandals

Kim Dae-jung Government 
In 2000, $500,000,000 dollars ($100,000,000 dollars of government money, and $400,000,000 dollars from Hyundai) was used to secure the Inter-Korean Summit. This was perceived by the general public as a bribe and a method of buying the summit, consequently leading to a public scandal in 2003. It was also rumoured that this large sum of money was the reason that Kim was awarded the 2002 Global Peace Prize for his 'Sunshine Policy' of that year. The scandal ultimately led to the arrest of former National Intelligence Service director Lim Dong-won, under the accusation of 'violating laws on foreign exchange transactions'. In May 2006, the current National Intelligence Service director, Park Jie-won, was also sentenced to three years imprisonment for his participation in the scandal, but was released in February 2007 and pardoned in December of that year.

In 2003, the scandal surrounding public eavesdropping and the illegal interception of phone calls took place under Kim Dae-jung's government. The act was later admitted to be true and to have taken place until March 2002, shortly before the end of Kim's term. The National Intelligence Service claimed that Kim Dae-jung was not informed of the illegal activities taking place.

Park Geun-hye government 
In 2012, Park Geun-hye's presidential election was revealed to have been manipulated by members of the National Intelligence Service (NIS) in order to ensure that a conservative candidate came into power. Agents were accused of manipulating public opinions surrounding the election through means such as social media, as ordered by the NIS. This led to former spy chief Won Sei-hoon's three-year imprisonment in 2015 in connection to the case. Park Geun-hye was later charged on 31 March 2017, and again on 17 April of that year for the abuse of power, bribery, coercion, and leaking government secrets. Similar manipulations were revealed to have taken place in 2011 and earlier in 2012, with surveillance being placed on other opposing politicians.

Following the 2016 South Korean political scandal and corruption surrounding Park Geun-hye's presidential role, two former NIS chiefs were arrested in November 2017. Nam Jae-joon and Lee Byung-kee were arrested for embezzlement and bribery, having illegally funded ₩4 billion won ($3.6 million) to Park and her presidential office. The money came directly from the NIS' budget without oversight from the National Assembly, though the confidentiality of the financing dictates that the NIS not be obligated to disclose all expenditures.

Lee Myung-bak government 
As Park Geun-hye's predecessor, the Lee Myung-bak administration was under suspicion of involvement with the 2012 Public Opinion Manipulation scandal with the National Intelligence Service.

On 15 March 2018, Lee also admitted to receiving ₩106 million won ($100,000 dollars) of money originally allocated to the NIS. Lee denied most other corruption charges, but refused to state what the ₩106 million won was used for, with many claiming that it contributed to North Korea-related activities.

Cybersecurity 
The National Intelligence Service in Korea is responsible for overseeing national cybersecurity policy and defending against cyber threats, including distributed denial of service (DDoS) attacks. The NIS also investigates any cyber intrusions and conducts information analyses on cyber threats. The NIS' responsibility to protect networks against cyber threats has become increasingly more important following the 2009 and 2011 cyber attacks.

The South Korean National Intelligence Service implemented the Security Verification Scheme in order to amplify the security of the national information communications network. The Security Verification Scheme is a system that verifies the safety of 'information security systems, network devices, and other IT products' used in government and public institutions. The NIS also established the Korea Cryptographic Module Validation Program in 2005 which focuses on validating the security and implementing 'conformance of a CM for the protection of sensitive information' in both governmental and public institutions.

Intelligence on North Korea 
One of the National Intelligence Service's core duties is to collect intelligence on North Korea. The primary goal of this activity is to provide the government with information to formulate inter-Korean strategies that both protect South Korea and lead towards future reunification. According to the NIS website, one of the key types of intelligence that the NIS works to gather are signs of possible North Korean provocations and potential security threats. Through surveilling these areas, they then construct measures to combat such risks. The NIS also monitors North Korea's political, military, diplomatic, economic and social developments in order to assess their impact on inter-Korean relations and therefore assist in providing the government context to help create effective policy.

Ultimately, the NIS also claims to 'support [the] establishment of a unified Korea led by the Republic of Korea'. While protecting the South from North Korean aggression, the NIS also states that one of its main goals is to simultaneously preserve international relations in order to 'support [the] creation of a unified Korea under liberal democracy'.

Controversy 
The National Intelligence Service has come under fire on numerous occasions for providing inaccurate intel on North Korea. In 2011, the NIS appeared to have no prior knowledge of the death of Kim Jong-il and has also failed to provide forewarning on Pyongyang's nuclear missile tests in the past. In 2016, the accuracy of NIS intelligence was further brought into question after they were allegedly responsible for falsely reporting the death of North Korean army official Ri Yong-il, who was later found to be alive.

Former deputy director of the North Korea bureau at the NIS, Ra Jong-yil, defended the organisation, stating that "in the case of the NIS, it is particularly handicapped by the fact that its main target is a country which is the most secretive, hermetically sealed from the outside". In an interview with The Diplomat, he argued that the NIS was at a disadvantage due to the opening up of the government which in turn resulted in their activities becoming overexposed. He theorised that in some cases this could also allow for North Korea to intentionally act deceptively in order to publicly discredit one of their main South Korean targets.

In 2016, the South Korean government voted to reduce the role of the NIS in intelligence activities and pass the duty of investigating those with ties to North Korea to the national police service. This came after numerous reports of the NIS "aiding conservative politicians in elections and persecuting opposing voices by linking them to North Korea". During the 2012 election, the NIS participated in a smear-campaign against candidate Moon Jae-in that ultimately contributed to Park Geun-hye securing the win.

See also

 List of Directors of the National Intelligence Service (South Korea) and predecessor organizations
 Manipulation of public opinion by National Intelligence Service during 2012 South Korean presidential election
 NIS illegal wiretapping scandal
 :Category:National Intelligence Service (South Korea) in fiction

Citations

General references 
 John Larkin, "Cleaning House: South Korea's shady spy agency is being overhauled, but will it still be able to catch North Korean spooks?" – Time Asia, June 9, 2003.
 JPRI Working Paper No. 20 – Korean Scandal, or American Scandal?, Japan Policy Research Institute
 Dolf-Alexander Neuhaus, "South Korea", in: Intelligence Communities and Cultures in Asia and the Middle East: A Comprehensive Reference, 315–336. Edited by Bob de Graaff, Lynne Rienner Publishers, Incorporated, 2020.

External links

 Official NIS site (Korean)
 Official NIS site (English)
 NIS Documents, some translated NIS publications (mostly on North Korean military and economic capabilities, circa 1999)
 South Korea's "Spy" Agency – ANSP ("KCIA"), collection of articles (mostly critical) on the agency's activities

 
Government of South Korea
South Korean intelligence agencies
Seocho District